The Women's road time trial at the 2014 Commonwealth Games, as part of the cycling programme, was held on 31 July 2014.

Route
The  event started at Glasgow Green at 10am, with each of the riders beginning by heading east to Dennistoun and Haghill. The route continued north-east through Riddrie to the main circuit. The riders turned west and then north towards Barmulloch and Robroyston, before heading east through Auchinloch and on to Chryston. The route then headed south to Muirhead and turned west through Stepps and Millerston, back towards the finish at Glasgow Green.

Results

References

Women's road time trial
2014 in women's road cycling
Road cycling at the Commonwealth Games